Amtsleiter (Office Leader) was a Nazi Party political rank which existed between 1933 and 1938. The rank was created as a "catch all" political staff position across all levels of the Nazi Party (local, county, region, and national) and encompassed a wide array of duties and responsibilities.

A special rank of Hauptamtsleiter existed on the Reichsleitung (National Level) of the Nazi Party. In 1939, the two ranks of Amtsleiter were phased out of the Nazi Party and replaced by several new paramilitary political ranks.

References
 Clark, J. (2007). Uniforms of the NSDAP. Atglen, PA: Schiffer Publishing
 Christian Zentner, Friedemann Bedürftig (1991). The Encyclopedia of the Third Reich.  Macmillan, New York. 

Nazi political ranks